The Duri–Tangerang railway is a railway connecting Tangerang to Jakarta, the capital city of Indonesia. It was constructed during the Dutch colonial age, as a branch line from the Jakarta Kota-Anyer Kidul railway. The railway is serviced by KA Commuter Jabodetabek's brown line.

History
The public railway company Staatsspoorwegen built the line in 1899 as part of the Western railways in order to improve connections with the western regions of the island of Java.

On 2 January 1899 the first part of the Jakarta Kota-Anyer Kidul mainline was opened between Batavia Zuid (Jakarta Kota) and Tangerang. After completing the railway in the following year, the line between Duri and Tangerang remained as a mere branch line.

The entire railway is currently electrified with 1.5 kV DC overhead lines, accommodating the electric commuter trains of KA Commuter Jabodetabek's Brown line. An additional track was added in 2012, resulting in a double track along the entire stretch between Tangerang and Duri.

In order to connect Jakarta's main airport to the railway network, a line branching off at Batu Ceper railway station is being constructed. This branch line was scheduled to be completed in 2016.

Stations
There are eleven stations on the line:
 Duri
 Grogol
 Pesing
 Taman Kota, (formerly Kembangan)
 Bojong Indah
 Rawa Buaya
 Kalideres
 Poris
 Batuceper; connecting with a future branch line to Soekarno-Hatta International Airport
 Tanah Tinggi
 Tangerang

Services
 KA Commuter Jabodetabek: Brown line (Duri-Tangerang)

References

External links 
 KRL Jabotabek website 
 Jabotabek Railnews 
 KRL Jabodetabek 
 KRL-Mania - KRL Jabotabek community site 

Railway lines in Indonesia
3 ft 6 in gauge railways in Indonesia
Railway lines opened in 1899